Megachile nigricans is a species of bee in the family Megachilidae. It was described by Cameron in 1898.

References

Nigricans
Insects described in 1898